Wang Yintai (pinyin: Wáng Yìntài, Wade-Giles: Wang Yin-t'ai) (1886 - December 15, 1961) was a politician in the Republic of China. He belonged to Fengtian clique, later he became an important politician during the Provisional Government of the Republic of China and the Wang Jingwei regime (Republic of China-Nanjing). He was born in Fenyang, Shanxi, and original place was Shaoxing, Zhejiang. His father was a politician and scholar, Wang Shitong.

Biography

In the Beijing Government 
Wang Yintai went to Japan where he graduated the 1st High School (:ja:第一高等学校 (旧制)) in 1906. Next, he went to Germany where he graduated Department of Law, University of Berlin in 1912. In next year he returned to China, belonged to the Beijing Government, and successively held the positions of lecturer of the Department of Law to the Peking University and bench of the High Public Prosecutor, etc.

In 1919 Wang Yintai was appointed Legal adviser to the Office for the Custody of Enemy Property and the Special Agent to Kulun (Ulan Bator), Outer Mongolia. In next Year he transferred to Director of General Affairs Department, Kulun Pacification Agency.　In 1921 he went to Northeast, and became a legal adviser for Zhang Zuolin. In 1926 he was appointed Vice-Minister for Foreign Affairs, and served concurrently as a delegate plenipotentiary to the Chinese Tariff Revision Conference, Chairman of the Sino-Russian Conference Commission.

In 1927 Pan Fu(潘復)'s Cabinet was formed, Wang Yintai was appointed Minister for Foreign Affairs. And Wang also held Vice-president of Research Society for Treaty and the General Manager of the China Financial Bank. In February 1928 he transferred to Minister for Justice, namely the final Minister for Justice in Beijing Government. In June Beijing Government had collapsed, Wang escaped to Northeast. Later he went to Shanghai and was an established lawyer.

In the Provisional Government and the Wang Jingwei regime 

In December 1937 Wang Kemin established the Provisional Government of the Republic of China, Wang Yintai also participated in it, and was appointed Minister for Business. In March 1940 the Wang Jingwei regime was established, Wang Yintai transferred to Governor of the General Office for Business, the North China Political Council. On that time, he also held the position of Executive Member of the same Council. In November 1943 he was appointed Governor of the General Office for Agriculture and Chief to the Agency for General Affairs in the same Council. In February 1945 he was promoted to be Chairperson of the North China Political Council.

After the Wang Jingwei regime collapsed, Wang Yintai was arrested by Chiang Kai-shek's National Government of the Republic of China at Beiping in December 1945. In next October 8, because of the charge of treason and surrender to enemy (namely Hanjian), he was sentenced to death on Nanjing High Court. He appealed to the Supreme Court, he was commuted to life imprisonment in December 1947. He was imprisoned in Shanghai. After the People's Republic of China was established, his treatment wasn't changed.

Wang Yintai died in prison on December 15, 1961.

Alma mater 
Humboldt University of Berlin

References

Footnotes 
 
 
 
  History of Prison in Shanghai, The Office of Shanghai’s History (上海地方志办公室) Website
 
 

Republic of China politicians from Shanxi
Foreign Ministers of the Republic of China
Chinese collaborators with Imperial Japan
1886 births
1961 deaths
Politicians from Linfen
Humboldt University of Berlin alumni
Chinese expatriates in Germany
Chinese people who died in prison custody
Prisoners who died in Chinese detention
Justice Ministers of the Republic of China
Prisoners sentenced to death by China
Chinese prisoners sentenced to death
Chinese prisoners sentenced to life imprisonment
Prisoners sentenced to life imprisonment by China